Sand Creek is a  tributary of the St. Croix River in Pine County, eastern Minnesota, United States.

See also
List of rivers of Minnesota

References

External links
Minnesota Watersheds
USGS Hydrologic Unit Map - State of Minnesota (1974)

Rivers of Minnesota
Rivers of Pine County, Minnesota